Morné Nico van Wyk (born 20 March 1979) is a South African professional cricketer who has played in 17 One Day Internationals for South Africa. He is also the brother of fellow cricketer Divan van Wyk.

Domestic career
In October 2018, he was named in Durban Heat's squad for the first edition of the Mzansi Super League T20 tournament.

Morne van Wyk along with Cameron Delport set the record for the highest opening stand in List A matches with an unbeaten 367 in the South African Domestic League matches in 2014. He also represented the Kolkata Knight Riders in the Indian Premier League scoring 167 runs from the 5 matches he played with a highest score of 74.

International career
He has also functioned as a wicket-keeper. He made his ODI debut at Lord's in 2003, scoring 17 in a very low scoring game. In  January 2011 in a Twenty20 International match against India, Morné scored the quickest half-century ever by a South African. It came off only 24 balls.

During the 2014–15 West Indian tour of South Africa, van Wyk scored a Twenty20 International century in the third T20I of the series, and by doing so became the third South African to score a T20I century.

References

External links
 
 Interview by www.world-a-team.com with Morne van Wyk

1979 births
Living people
Knights cricketers
Free State cricketers
Kolkata Knight Riders cricketers
Durban Heat cricketers
South African cricketers
South Africa One Day International cricketers
South Africa Twenty20 International cricketers
Cricketers from Bloemfontein
Quetta Gladiators cricketers
Cricketers at the 2011 Cricket World Cup
Wicket-keepers
20th-century South African people
21st-century South African people